Joseph Torchia (December 15, 1946 – April 22, 1996) was an American author and photographer. In the late 1970s he also worked as a reporter for The Palm Beach, The San Francisco Chronicle and The San Francisco Examiner.

Torchia was born in Johnsonburg, Pennsylvania, where he graduated in 1964 (Johnsonburg High School). After his studies at the University of Florida (1968) he spent two years in the Peace Corps (1968–1970). After having left journalism, Torchia owned a photography studio during the last 15 years of his life.

Works by Torchia

 The Kryptonite Kid (1979)
 As If After Sex (1983)
 The Edible Variety (unpub)
 Purgatory, PA. (unpub)
 First Communion – a short story (Gay Sunshine Journal, no 47, 1982, p 90-104)

External links
Obituary in the San Francisco Chronicle (Wednesday, April 24, 1996)
Review of 'The Kryptonite Kid' by Jack Veasey
The 'Kryptonite Kid' – A Review by S. Future
“The Kryptonite Kid” (1979 novel involving Superman) - interview with author’s family
Guide to the Joseph Torchia papers at Stanford University

1996 deaths
20th-century American novelists
American male novelists
People from Elk County, Pennsylvania
Novelists from Pennsylvania
1948 births
20th-century American male writers